The 2009 Yukon/NWT Men's Curling Championship (Canada's men's territorial curling championship) was held February 12–15 at the Yellowknife Curling Club in Yellowknife, Northwest Territories. The winner represented team Yukon/Northwest Territories at the 2009 Tim Hortons Brier in Calgary.

Teams

Standings

Results

Draw 1
February 12, 1930

Draw 2
February 13, 1000

Draw 3
February 13, 1500

Draw 4
February 14, 1000

Draw 5
February 14, 1500

Draw 6
February 15, 0900

External links
Northwest Territories Curling Association
Yukon Curling Association
Yellowknife Curling Club

Sources
 Team lists provided by the Manager of the Yellowknife Curling Club via email.

Yukon nwt Mens Curling Championship, 2009
2009 in the Northwest Territories
Curling in the Northwest Territories
Curling in Yukon